Rituko Kimata Pooh is a Japanese obstetrician and gynecologist.

Current Position 

 President, Fetal Diagnostic Center, Fetal Brain Center, CRIFM Prenatal Medical Clinic, Osaka, Japan
 Adjunct Professor, Wayne State University School of Medicine, Detroit, USA
 Honorary Professor, Pirogov Russian National Research Medical University, Moscow, Russia
 Regular Professor, Department of Health Science, Dubrovnik International University, Dubrovnik, Croatia
 Affiliate Professor, Juntendo University School of Medicine, Tokyo, Japan
 CEO, Ritz Medical Co.,Ltd. Clinical Genetic Laboratory, Osaka, Japan

Biography
Ritsuko Kimata Pooh was born in Osaka, Japan in 1960. She graduated from Law Department of Keio University, Tokyo, and graduated from Medical school of Tokushima University with social, legal and ethical viewpoints. After her graduation from Medical school in 1990, she has dedicated her most of time to clinical research and investigation on sonoembryology and sonogenetics in perinatology.

Pooh received the Alfred Kratochwil Award during the ISUOG congress in 2011, the Lifetime achievement award during the WCPM (World Congress in Perinatal Medicine) in 2015, and the Sir William Liley medal during the International Congress on Fetus as a Patient in 2016.

Awards

 Alfred Kratochwil Award, The International Society of Ultrasound in Obstetrics and Gynecology (2011, Los Angeles)
 Lifetime achievement award, World Association of Perinatal Medicine (2015, Madrid)
 Sir William Liley Award, The International Society of The Fetus as a Patient (2016, Tirana)
Short Oral Presentation Award, 26th World Congress on Ultrasound in Obstetrics and Gynecology (2016, Rome)  -Clinical significance of 3D HDlive silhouette/flow in neurosonoembryology and fetal neurosonography- 
"Magnificent achievements in the visualization of early human development" Award (2019, Istanbul)
JSOG Congress Encouragement Award, Japan Society of Obstetrics and Gynecology (2020, Tokyo)

Sources

1960 births
Living people
Japanese obstetricians
Japanese gynaecologists
Keio University alumni
Tokushima University alumni